Caroline Chiu Sin-wing (also Chiu Sin-wing, ; born April 29, 1984) is a Hong Kong former swimmer, who specialized in breaststroke events. She represented the new Hong Kong, China, as a 16-year-old, at the 2000 Summer Olympics, and was also a member of the territory's squad at the 2002 Asian Games.

Chiu competed only in the women's 100 m breaststroke at the 2000 Summer Olympics in Sydney. She achieved a FINA B-cut of 1:13.71 from the Asian Championships in Busan, South Korea. She challenged seven other swimmers in heat two, including Bolivia's 26-year-old Katerine Moreno and Angola's Nádia Cruz, who competed in her fourth Olympic Games at age 25. She raced to the fifth seed in a time of 1:15.87, just 2.16 seconds below her national record and an entry standard. Chiu failed to advance into the semifinals, as she placed thirty-sixth overall in the prelims.

References

External links
 HK Swim Bio 

1984 births
Living people
Hong Kong female breaststroke swimmers
Olympic swimmers of Hong Kong
Swimmers at the 2000 Summer Olympics
Swimmers at the 2002 Asian Games
Asian Games competitors for Hong Kong